Carlia jarnoldae, the lined rainbow-skink, is a species of skink in the genus Carlia. It is endemic to Queensland in Australia.

References

Carlia
Reptiles described in 1975
Endemic fauna of Australia
Skinks of Australia
Taxa named by Jeanette Covacevich
Taxa named by Glen Joseph Ingram